Sepalcure is a musical collaboration between Travis Stewart (better known as Machinedrum) and Praveen Sharma (better known as Braille). Their self-titled debut album, Sepalcure, was released in 2011 on the Hotflush Recordings label.

Discography
Love Pressure (EP) (2010), Hotflush Recordings
Fleur (EP) (2011), Hotflush Recordings
Sepalcure (2011), Hotflush Recordings
Make You (EP) (2013), Hotflush Recordings
Fight for Us (EP) (2015), Hotflush Recordings
Folding Time (2016), Hotflush Recordings

References

American electronic music groups
Post-dubstep music groups
Musical groups established in 2011
Electronic dance music duos
Hotflush Recordings artists
2011 establishments in the United States